Parapercis australis is a fish species in the sandperch family, Pinguipedidae. It is found in Queensland, Australia and the island of Tonga.

References

Pinguipedidae
Taxa named by John Ernest Randall
Fish described in 2003